Aïn Torki is a town in northern Algeria.

References

External links

Communes of Aïn Defla Province